"Firecracker" is a song co-written and recorded by American country music artist Josh Turner.  It was released in June 2007 as the lead-off single from Turner's album Everything Is Fine, which was released on MCA Nashville on October 30, 2007. His fastest-climbing single, the song reached a peak of number 2 on the Billboard Hot Country Songs charts.  Turner wrote this song with Shawn Camp and Pat McLaughlin.

Content
The song is an up-tempo number in which the narrator describes the intensity of his lover as being comparable to the explosion of a firecracker.

Music video
A music video was released to promote the single, directed by Peter Zavadil. In the video, Josh Turner is seen pulling up to a fireworks outlet. While he is inside shopping, mixed in are scenes of a young man,  flirting with the girl at the counter, played by Miss Kentucky Teen USA 2005, Sarah Bryan Withers. Turner is shown performing the song on an outdoor stage in parts of the video.
The video is shot in Kimball, Tennessee, near Jasper and South Pittsburg.

Chart performance
"Firecracker" debuted at #58 on the U.S. Billboard Hot Country Songs for the week of July 14, 2007. In its 24th week on the chart, the song jumped from #4 to #2 on the chart, being held from the top spot by Taylor Swift's "Our Song", which leapfrogged "Firecracker" when the former leaped from #6 to #1. The song held the position for two weeks. It was later ranked at #53 on the year-end chart.

Year-end charts

Certifications

References

2007 singles
Josh Turner songs
Songs written by Shawn Camp (musician)
Music videos directed by Peter Zavadil
Song recordings produced by Frank Rogers (record producer)
Songs written by Pat McLaughlin
MCA Nashville Records singles
Songs written by Josh Turner
2007 songs